Coen Boerman (born 11 November 1976) is a Dutch former cyclist, who competed as a professional from 2000 to 2002 with . He rode in the 2000 Giro d'Italia and the 2001 and 2002 Paris–Roubaix.

Major results

1996
 1st Rund um Köln Amateurs
1997
 1st Stage 9 Olympia's Tour
 3rd Road race, National Under-23 Road Championships
1998
 1st Kattekoers
 1st 
 2nd Overall Tour du Loir-et-Cher
 2nd ZLM Tour
 3rd Time trial, National Under-23 Road Championships
 6th Overall Olympia's Tour
1999
 1st Stage 1 Circuit des Mines
 1st Stage 4 Volta a Lleida
 3rd Overall Olympia's Tour
 3rd Internationale Wielertrofee Jong Maar Moedig
2001
 3rd Ronde van Noord-Holland
2002
 1st Stage 1 (ITT) Guldensporentweedaagse
 5th Nokere Koerse

References

External links

1976 births
Living people
Dutch male cyclists
Sportspeople from Almelo
Cyclists from Overijssel
20th-century Dutch people